The Statue of Liberty replica in Oklahoma City is installed outside the Oklahoma County Courthouse (near the intersection of Park and Hudson), in the U.S. state of Oklahoma. It was made as part of the Strengthen the Arm of Liberty campaign.

Background

The statue was dedicated in 1950, as one of approximately 200 replicas installed throughout the United States to commemorate the fortieth anniversary of the establishment of Boy Scouts of America. It was surveyed as part of the Smithsonian Institution's "Save Outdoor Sculpture!" program in 1994.

The replica of the Statue of Liberty (Liberty Enlightening the World) is an allegorical representation of Liberty. The female figure is shown wearing a crown and robes, and holding a torch and a book or tablet. The metal sculpture measures approximately 7 ft. 4 in. x 1 ft. 10 in. x 1 ft. 10 in., and rests on a pedestal and octagonal concrete base that measures approximately 5 ft. 4 in. x 3 ft. 2 in. x 2 ft. 8 in. A plaque on the base has the inscription: WITH THE FAITH AND COURAGE OF / THEIR FOREFATHERS WHO MADE / POSSIBLE THE FREEDOM OF THESE / UNITED STATES / THE BOY SCOUTS OF AMERICA / DEDICATE THIS REPLICA OF THE / STATUE OF LIBERTY AS A PLEDGE / OF EVERLASTING FIDELITY / AND LOYALTY / 40TH ANNIVERSARY CRUSADE TO / STRENGTHEN THE ARM OF LIBERTY / 1950.

See also

 1950 in art

References

External links
 Statue of Liberty Replica, (sculpture) - Oklahoma City, OK at Waymarking

1950 establishments in Oklahoma
1950 sculptures
Allegorical sculptures in the United States
Concrete sculptures in the United States
Outdoor sculptures in Oklahoma City
Oklahoma City
Sculptures of women in Oklahoma
Statues in Oklahoma